Gina Cigna (6 March 1900 – 26 June 2001) was a French-Italian dramatic soprano.

Biography

Gina Cigna was born in Angers, department of Maine-et-Loire, to parents of Italian origin. She trained as a pianist at the Paris Conservatory studying with Alfred Cortot and graduated with a gold medal. She then started a career as a recitalist. She met French tenor Maurice Sens, whom she married in 1921, and following his advice turned to singing. She took private lessons with Emma Calvé, Hariclea Darclée and Rosina Storchio, but was mostly self-taught.

She made her debut as Geneviève Sens in 1927 at the Teatro alla Scala, in Milan, as Freia in Das Rheingold, and sang minor roles in Boris Godunov and Ariane et Barbe-Bleue under Arturo Toscanini, without much success.

Two years later, still at La Scala, but this time under the name Gina Cigna, she sang the role of Donna Elvira in Don Giovanni, and this time it was a triumph. A few weeks later she appeared as Elisabeth in Tannhäuser.

She was to sing regularly at La Scala until 1945, quickly establishing herself as one of the leading Italian dramatic soprano alongside Maria Caniglia in operas such as Il Trovatore, Un ballo in maschera, La forza del destino, Aida, Andrea Chénier, and Tosca.

She recorded Norma in 1937 and Turandot, opposite Francesco Merli, with Magda Olivero as Liù, in 1938, both for Cetra Records. She sang at the Paris Opéra, the Royal Opera House in London, the Lyric Opera of Chicago, the San Francisco Opera, and the New York Metropolitan Opera, where she made her debut on 6 February 1937 as Aida.

Cigna's career came to a halt in 1948 when she was involved in a serious car accident and suffered a heart attack. Forced to retire from singing, she turned to teaching. In 1996 at the age of 96 she appeared in Jan Schmidt-Garre's film Opera Fanatic.

Death
Cigna died in Milan, Italy, on 26 June 2001, aged 101.

Studio recordings
 Bellini - Norma - Gina Cigna, Ebe Stignani,  Giovanni Breviario, Tancredi Pasero - Vittorio Gui - 1937
 Puccini - Turandot - Gina Cigna, Francesco Merli, Magda Olivero, Luciano Neroni - Franco Ghione - 1938

References

Sources
 Dictionnaire des interprètes, Alain Pâris, (Éditions Robert Laffont, 1989); 
 Guide de l’opéra, R. Mancini & J-J. Rouveroux, (Fayard, 1995); 

1900 births
2001 deaths
French operatic sopranos
French centenarians
French people of Italian descent
20th-century French women opera singers
Women centenarians